
The Drunkard is an 1844 American temperance play.

The Drunkard may also refer to:

Films
 The Drunkard (1935 film), an American drama
 The Drunkard (1937 film), a French drama
 The Drunkard (1950 film), a Greek drama
 The Drunkard (1953 film), a French drama

Other arts and entertainment
 The Drunkard, an 1898 Eugène Laermans painting
 "The Drunkard", a short story in the collection Traveller's Samples by Frank O'Connor
 The Drunkard, a poem by Ignacy Krasicki

People
 List of people known as the Drunkard

See also
 Kudimagan (English: Drunkard), a 2019 Indian Tamil-language film